Rajinder Rana (born 6 April 1966) is an Indian politician representing the Indian National Congress. He is a member of the 13th Himachal Pradesh Legislative Assembly, representing the Sujanpur assembly constituency of Himachal Pradesh.

References 

Himachal Pradesh MLAs 2017–2022
1966 births
Living people
Indian National Congress politicians from Himachal Pradesh